Capossela is a surname. People with that name include:

 Chris Capossela (born 1969), senior Microsoft executive
 Fred Capossela (1902–1991), American Thoroughbred race track announcer
 Fred "Cappy" Capossela Stakes, American Thoroughbred horse race
 Vinicio Capossela (born 1965), Italian singer-songwriter

See also